William Charles "Bill" Allen (born November 20, 1947 in Minneapolis, Minnesota) is an American sailor and Olympic champion.

Allen received a gold medal in the Soling class at the 1972 Summer Olympics in Munich.

References

External links

1947 births
American male sailors (sport)
Living people
Olympic gold medalists for the United States in sailing
Sailors at the 1972 Summer Olympics – Soling
Medalists at the 1972 Summer Olympics
Sportspeople from Minneapolis